This article refers to the Court of Bosnia and Herzegovina, a domestic court which includes international judges and prosecutors and a section for war crimes; it should not be confused with the separate International Criminal Tribunal for the Former Yugoslavia, which is an international criminal court within the United Nations (UN). It also should not be confused with Constitutional Court of Bosnia and Herzegovina.

The Court of Bosnia and Herzegovina (Cyrillic: Суд Босне и Херцеговине; abbreviated as the Court of BiH in English) is the highest ordinary court of Bosnia and Herzegovina. It was established on 3 July 2002 by the Parliament of Bosnia and Herzegovina with the Law on the Court of BiH, promulgated on 12 November 2000 by the High Representative for Bosnia and Herzegovina.

The Court of Bosnia and Herzegovina, which is based in Sarajevo (88 Kraljice Jelene street) was necessary to provide for judicial protection in the matters that under the Constitution of Bosnia and Herzegovina fall under the jurisdiction of the Court of BiH, such as fight against terrorism, war crimes, human trafficking, organized and economic crimes. Also, with the aim of establishing the rule of law, it is important to underline the role of the Court of BiH, which will also work on the harmonization of standards in court proceedings. Essentially, the role of the Court of BiH is similar to the role of the federal judiciary of the United States (except the Supreme Court), but without diversity jurisdiction.

The Court is a judicial body which does not have a time-limited mandate. Unlike the International Criminal Tribunal for the Former Yugoslavia whose work is regulated by the Statute issued by the UN Security Council and the Rulebook adopted by the ICTY judges, the Court of BiH hands down verdicts in accordance with the laws of the State of Bosnia and Herzegovina, such as the BiH Criminal Code and the BiH Criminal Procedure Code. Besides the fact that the international judges and prosecutors worked at the Court of BiH and the Prosecutor's Office of BiH (until 2009), the key functions are held by the citizens of Bosnia and Herzegovina. Trials are conducted in one of the official languages of BiH in accordance with the national laws, while the convicted persons serve their time in prisons in BiH.

Competencies of the Court of BiH
The competencies of the Court of BiH are regulated by the Law on the Court of BiH and are related to criminal, administrative and appellate jurisdiction.

Within its criminal jurisdiction, the Court of BiH tries cases pertaining to the crimes laid down by the laws of BiH, which include war crimes, organized crime, economic crime and corruption cases.

Administrative jurisdiction means that the Court of BiH adjudicates cases pertaining to the decisions issued by BiH institutions and other organizations in charge of public functions, such as property disputes related to the performance of public functions between the States and the Political divisions of Bosnia and Herzegovina, breaches of the election law, etc.

However, the Court of BiH does not act on appeals from decisions issued by Political divisions of Bosnia and Herzegovina courts.

Divisions and Sections
There are three Divisions within the Court of BiH: Criminal, Administrative and Appellate. The Criminal Division contains: Section I – War Crimes Chamber; Section II – Organized Crime, Economic Crime and Corruption and Section III – General Crime.

The Appellate Division rules on appeals against decisions made within the Criminal and Administrative divisions, decides on complaints related to the breaches of the Election Law, as well in other cases as provided by the laws of BiH.

Within the Court of BiH there exists the Registry for War Crimes and Organized Crime, Economic Crime and Corruption.

The Common Secretariat provides administrative support to the General Crime Section and the Administrative Division.

The role of the Registry is to provide the Court of BiH with the conditions for its efficient work by rendering administrative support to Sections I and II for War Crimes and Organized Crime.

The President of the Court and his/her role
The High Judicial and Prosecutorial Council appoints the President of the Court of BiH. President of the Court of BiH is one of the Judges appointed to the Court of BiH, who must possess the required managerial and organizational skills important for the work of the Court of BiH. President is appointed to a mandate of six (6) years and can be reappointed.

The responsibilities of the President of the Court are regulated by the Law on the Court of BiH and internal acts of the Court. President of the Court, inter alia, has the following responsibilities:

representing the Court of BiH in relations with the state-level bodies and organizations;
assignment of judges to Divisions and Chambers;
appointing replacements for judges in cases of recusal/disqualification of judges;
scheduling Plenum sessions, management of cases and assignment of cases among members of the Court of BiH, and if necessary assigning the Division/Section in charge;
convening and chairing the Plenum of the Court of BiH;
Court of BiH budget execution;
managing the staff of the Court of BiH.

Appointment of the judges
According to the Law, the High Judicial and Prosecutorial Council appoints Judges including the President of the Court of BiH, lay judges and additional judges to the Court of BiH. The HJPC advertises job vacancies, and then decides on the appointment. Judges of the Court of BiH must have at least eight years of experience as judges, prosecutors, attorneys or other relevant legal experience following the bar exam, and are appointed for life, having in mind the fact that their term in office may cease in case they resign or reach the age limit which is obligatory for retirement, or in case they are removed from office for the reasons stipulated in the Law.

Appointment of international judges and prosecutors
The Registry manages the process of appointing and engaging international judges who are appointed to Section I and the Section II of the Criminal and Appeal divisions, as well as international prosecutors who are appointed to the Special Departments.

After a joint recommendation of the President of the Court of BiH and the President of the High Judicial and Prosecutorial Council, the High Representative appoints international judges. After a joint recommendation of the Chief Prosecutor of BiH, the President of the High Judicial and Prosecutorial Council and the Registry, the High Representative appoints international prosecutor. International judges and prosecutors are appointed by the High Representative by the powers vested in him by Article 5, Annex 10, of the Dayton Peace Accord.

There are 42 national and 16 international judges.

The budget of the Court of BiH
The total amount allocated in the national budget for the Court of BiH in 2006 equates to 5,328,800 Bosnia and Herzegovina konvertibilna marka (Approximately US$3,7 million). The funds are being used for salaries, allowances and other reimbursements for the judges and administrative support staff, their travel allowances, office costs, building and equipment maintenance, legal and professional fees and other purposes.

In addition to this amount, the international community has donated approximately EUR 10 million in 2006 to support the work of the Court of BiH and the Prosecutor’s Office of BiH, particularly the work of the Special Department for War Crimes and Special Department for Organised Crimes as well as the work of the International Registry.

The Registry has contributed to the Court of BiH in the form of maintenance and capital expenditures such as equipment, construction works and similar. The amount of EUR 10 million also covers the expenses related to the engagement of the international judges, legal advisors and prosecutors. That amount is pledged through the international donations and managed separately from the budget of the state institutions.

It is planned that the integration process, i.e. the process of transferring financial responsibility form the Registry budget to the budgets of BiH will start in 2006. In practical terms this means the transfer of the staff from the Registry to their appropriate BiH budget, during 2006 to 2009.

The difference between the Court of BiH and the ICTY
The International Criminal Tribunal for the Former Yugoslavia is an ad hoc tribunal, which has a limited existence, and which was established to hand down verdicts for serious violations of international humanitarian law and for war crimes committed in the territory of the former Yugoslavia since 1991. This fact limits the mandate of the ICTY so that it can deliver judgments only for the most responsible persons who committed war crimes, in accordance with the time-frame and criteria for issuing the indictment as defined by the ICTY Prosecution (OTP).

The Registry
The Registry of the Court of Bosnia and Herzegovina (Bosnian: Ured registrara) was established on 1 December 2004 for a five-year period through "Agreement between the High Representative for Bosnia and Herzegovina and Bosnia and Herzegovina on the Establishment of the Registry for Section I for War Crimes and Section II for Organized Crime, Economic Crime and Corruption of the Criminal and Appellate Divisions of the Court of Bosnia and Herzegovina and the Special Department for War Crimes and the Special Department for Organized Crime, Economic Crime and Corruption of the Prosecutor’s Office of Bosnia and Herzegovina".

The mandate of the Registry is to manage and provide administrative, legal and other support services to Section I for War Crimes and Section II for Organized Crime, Economic Crime and Corruption of the Criminal and Appellate Divisions of the Court of Bosnia and Herzegovina as well as to provide support services to Special Departments of the Prosecutor’s Office, which include, but are not limited to, support to international judges and prosecutors in their work. The support services range from organizing and coordinating, in cooperation with relevant national authorities, of detention related activities, criminal defence and support to and protection of witnesses.

The Registry is located in the same premises as the Court of BiH and Prosecutor’s Office. The Registry currently employs around 270 staff.

Common Secretariat
The Common Secretariat is responsible for the administration and the provision of support services to Section III of the Criminal and Appellate Divisions and the Administrative Division. The Common Secretariat is managed by a Chief Registrar, assisted by two officers.

The Common Secretariat includes the "Department for legal, general, administrative and technical support affairs", the "Department for financial-material affairs", and the "Court Sections Legal Support Service".

Notable judgements of the Court of BiH

Some of the notable judgements of the Section I of the Court of Bosnia and Herzegovina may be listed as follows:

Sakib Mahmuljin
Sakib Mahmuljin, the former commander of the Third Corps of the Army of Bosnia and Herzegovina, ABiH, was sentenced by the Appeal Chamber of the State Court in April to eight years in prison for crimes committed in 1995 in Vozuca and Zavidovici on Serb population. He is not serving his jail sentence and is instead undergoing medical treatment in Turkey, his lawyer confirmed to BIRN. While organizations from Bosnia’s Serb-majority entity Republika Srpska believe Mahmuljin escaped due to the negligence of the judiciary, the State Court says that no prohibition measures were imposed on him and that he was not sent to serve his sentence. The Court of Bosnia and Herzegovina, asked by BIRN, clarified that Mahmuljin was not sent to serve a prison sentence, and that it was informed through his lawyer that he was undergoing treatment in Turkey. It said it was investigating the allegations, and that in the course of the referral procedure, will take adequate legal action. The court noted that, during the criminal proceedings until the end of the proceedings, no prohibition measures were imposed on the convicted person. Milorad Kojic, director of the Center for Research on War, War Crimes and the Search for Missing Persons of Republika Srpska entity, told BIRN that by not imposing any measures prohibiting people from leaving Bosnia, but also by not issuing a referral act for serving the sentence after the second-instance verdict, the Court enabled Mahmuljin “to escape under the pretext of treatment”. Mahmuljin’s lawyer, Vasvija Vidovic, confirmed to BIRN that he is undergoing treatment in Turkey. The Court of Bosnia and Herzegovina requested an international arrest warrant for Mahmuljin, because he did not respond to the summons on November 23 when he was supposed to be sent to serve his sentence.

Gojko Janković
Gojko Janković, born on 31 October 1954, in village Trbušće, Foča, Bosnia and Herzegovina.

The indictment alleged that, between April 1992 and February 1993, as a leader of a paramilitary group, Gojko Janković took part in a large-scale and systematic attack on the non-Serb population in the Foča municipality region, acting in co-ordination with the Foča-based brigade of the Republika Srpska Army. He allegedly also took part in the imprisonment, killing and sexual abuse of non-Serbs mainly Muslim women and young girls. It is alleged that the accused was involved in the abovementioned acts by issuing orders, aiding and abetting, and committing the crimes himself.

The accused voluntarily surrendered on 13 March 2005 and on 14 March 2005 he was transferred to the International Criminal Tribunal for the former Yugoslavia (ICTY) Detention unit in The Hague. ICTY decided to transfer the case to the Court of BiH on 15 November 2005. The accused was transferred to BiH on 8 December 2005. The Court of BiH confirmed/accepted the indictment against Gojko Janković on 20 February 2006.

On 16 February 2007, the Court of Bosnia and Herzegovina (BiH) rendered the first instance verdict in the Section I for War Crimes case of Gojko Janković, finding the Accused guilty of Crimes against humanity and sentencing him to 34 years imprisonment.

On 19 November 2007 the Appellate Panel issued the final verdict in the case of Gojko Janković, partially upholding the defence appeal, and modifying the Trial Panel’s verdict of 16 February 2007 in the legal qualification of the acts constituting the criminal offence of Crimes against Humanity, for which the Trial Panel had convicted the Accused. The Trial Panel’s verdict remains unchanged in the remaining parts, including the long term imprisonment of 34 years which the Trial Panel imposed on the Accused.

Dragan Damjanović
Dragan Damjanović born on 23 November 1961 in Sarajevo, Bosnia and Herzegovina.

The indictment alleged that between July 1992 and January 1993, as a part of widespread and systematic attack of the Republika Srpska Army (RSA) against Bosniak population from Vogošća area, Dragan Damjanović committed murders, torture, rapes of Muslim women and other inhumane acts.

The accused is in custody since 3 March 2006. The Court confirmed the indictment on 29 March 2006.

On 13 June 2007, the Appellate Panel of Section I for War Crimes of the Court of Bosnia and Herzegovina handed down the final verdict in the case of Dragan Damjanović, sentencing him to 20 years long term imprisonment.

Radisav Ljubinac
Radisav Ljubinac aka Pjano, born on 12 January 1958 in Ćemanovići, Rogatica, Bosnia and Herzegovina (BiH). The accused has been in custody since 20 December 2005.

According to the indictment, Radisav Ljubinac participated in the persecution of the Bosniak civilian population in the area of the Rogatica municipality from May to November 1992 on political, national, ethnic, cultural and religious grounds. It is further alleged that this persecution was carried out as part of a widespread and systematic attack by the Army and Police of the so-called Serbian Republic of Bosnia and Herzegovina and paramilitary units under the leadership of the Serb Democratic Party. The indictment was confirmed on 15 May 2006.

On 8 March 2007, by first instance verdict Radisav Ljubinac was found guilty of Crimes against humanity and sentenced to 10 years imprisonment.

On 23 October 2007, the Appellate Panel of Section I for War Crimes of the Court modified the Trial Panel’s verdict.  The Appellate Panel noted that the Trial Panel failed to dismiss a charge which the Prosecutor had dropped during the trial.  The Appellate Panel revised the Trial Panel’s verdict and dismissed this charge, while leaving the remaining parts of the verdict unchanged.

Neđo Samardžić
Neđo Samardžić, born on 7 April 1968 in Bileća, Bosnia and Herzegovina. The accused is in custody since 9 October 2005.

The indictment alleged that, in the period April 1992 - March 1993, on the territory of the Foča municipality the accused committed and helped commit killings, forced relocations of persons, deprivations of liberty, sex slavery, rapes and persecution of Bosniak inhabitants on national, religious, ethnic and sexual grounds.

The Court of BiH took over the case on 9 September 2005. The Court confirmed the indictment on 28 December 2005.

First instance trial panel found Neđo Samardžić guilty and sentenced him to twelve years imprisonment.  The Appellate Panel judgment found the accused guilty and sentenced him to final sentence of 24 years imprisonment.

Radovan Stanković
Radovan Stanković, born on 10 March 1969 in Trebičina, Foča, Bosnia and Herzegovina.

SFOR arrested him on 9 July 2002 and since 10 July 2002 he was in custody in the ICTY Detention Unit. ICTY transferred the case to the Court of BIH on 1 September 2005 and the accused was transferred in Bosnia and Herzegovina on 29 September 2005.

The indictment against Radovan Stankovic alleged that, in the period between April 1992 to February 1993, as a member of the Miljevina battalion, Foča tactical brigade, he committed, incited, aided and abetted the enslavement, torture, rape and killing of non-Serb civilians.  These acts were allegedly carried out as part of a widespread and systematic attack of the army of Serb Republic of Bosnia and Herzegovina, police and paramilitary formations against the non-Serb population of the Foča Municipality. The Court confirmed/accepted the indictment on 7 December 2005.

On 14 November 2006, by the first instance judgment Radovan Stanković was found guilty and sentenced to 16 years imprisonment. The Appellate Panel judgment on 17 April 2007 found the accused guilty and sentenced him to final sentence of 20 years long term imprisonment.

Nenad Tanasković
Nenad Tanasković aka Nešo, born on 20 November 1961 in the village of Donja Lijeska, Višegrad municipality. The Accused has been in custody since 11 July 2006.

The indictment alleges that, as a reserve policeman in the Višegrad Public Security Station, in the period April to June 1992, the Accused participated in a widespread or systematic attack of the Republika Srpska Army, police and paramilitary formations on the Bosnian Muslim civilian population of the Višegrad municipality.  It is alleged that during this attack hundreds of civilians were killed, tortured, beaten, raped, illegally deprived of liberty, detained in inhumane conditions and forcibly transferred out of this municipality. The indictment was confirmed on 6 October 2006.

On 24 August 2007, by first instance verdict, Nenad Tanasković was found guilty for the crimes against humanity and sentenced to 12 years imprisonment.  On 26. March 2008, the Appellate Panel of Section I for War Crimes of the Court of Bosnia and Herzegovina modified the Trial Panel’s verdict regarding the sentencing, so the Accused Nenad Tanasković is now sentenced to 8 years of imprisonment for the criminal offense of Crimes against Humanity.

Nikola Andrun
Nikola Andrun, born on 22 November 1957 in Domanovići, Čapljina Municipality, Bosnia and Herzegovina. The indictment charged Nikola Andrun with acting contrary to Geneva Conventions in his capacity as the deputy head of the camp "Gabela" (municipality of Čapljina) during the second half of 1993, at the time of a conflict between the Army of Bosnia and Herzegovina and the Croatian Defense Council (HVO).

The Accused has been in custody since 30 November 2005. The Court confirmed the indictment on 27 April 2006.  On 20 August 2007, the Appellate Panel issued a decision revoking the Trial Panel’s verdict and ordering retrial before the Appellate Panel.

The re-trial before the Appellate Panel commenced on 26 March 2008.

The Appellate Panel of Section I for War Crimes of the Court of Bosnia and Herzegovina revoked the first-instance Verdict by which the Accused Andrun was found guilty of the criminal offense of War Crimes against Civilians and sentenced to 13 years of imprisonment, and on 19 August 2008 delivered the second-instance Verdict by which the Accused Nikola Andrun was found guilty of the criminal offense of War Crimes against Civilians and sentenced to 18 years of imprisonment.

External links
  War Crimes
 The Court of Bosnia and Herzegovina
 Prosecutor's Office of Bosnia and Herzegovina
 The Registry for War Crimes and Organized Crime
 The Ministry of Justice of Bosnia and Herzegovina
 Relevant laws of Bosnia and Herzegovina

Courts in Bosnia and Herzegovina
2002 establishments in Bosnia and Herzegovina
Courts and tribunals established in 2002